Uncial 096 (in the Gregory-Aland numbering), α 1004 (Soden), is a Greek uncial manuscript of the New Testament, dated paleographically to the 7th-century.

Description 

The codex contains a small part of the Acts of the Apostles 2:6-17; 26:7-18, on two parchment leaves (29 cm by 22 cm). The text is written in one column per page, 26 lines per page, in uncial letters. It is a palimpsest, the upper text was written in Georgian, in the 10th-century.

The Greek text of this codex is a mixture of text-types. Aland placed it in Category III.

Currently it is dated by the INTF to the 7th century.

The codex is located now at the Russian National Library (Gr. 19) in Saint Petersburg.

See also 

 List of New Testament uncials
 Textual criticism

References

Further reading 

 C. v. Tischendorf, Monumenta sacra inedita I (Leipzig: 1855), pp. 37–38, 41–42.

7th-century biblical manuscripts
Palimpsests
Greek New Testament uncials
National Library of Russia collection